Chariesthes cervina is a species of beetle in the family Cerambycidae. It was described by Hintz in 1910. It is known from Tanzania.

References

Endemic fauna of Tanzania
Chariesthes
Beetles described in 1910